John A. Jane, Sr. (September 21, 1931 – September 18, 2015) was an American neurosurgeon, and Professor of Neurosurgery at the University of Virginia. He was Chairman of the Department of Neurosurgery at the University of Virginia from 1969–2006.

Early life and education
John Jane was born in 1931 in Chicago. He graduated from the University of Chicago with a B.A. cum laude in 1951, and then attended the University of Chicago School of Medicine, receiving his Doctor of Medicine in 1956. He did his internship at the Royal Victoria Hospital at McGill University and returned to begin his neurosurgical residency at the University of Chicago clinics in 1957 with Dr. Sean Mullan. In 1958, he was a fellow in neurophysiology at the Montreal Neurological Institute with Dr. Herbert Jasper.

Career
Dr. Jane was the program director for the University of Virginia School of Medicine hospital's residency training program in Neurosurgery. He is the former editor-in-chief of the Journal of Neurosurgery, a position he had held from 1992 to 2013. During his tenure as the Journal of Neurosurgery's editor, he also founded the Journal of Neurosurgery: Spine, the Journal of Neurosurgery: Pediatrics, and Neurosurgical Focus, the first peer-reviewed, online neurosurgery journal. Dr. Jane treated actor Christopher Reeve after the horse riding accident that left Reeve a quadriplegic.

Awards
In 2004, Dr. Jane was named a Cushing Medalist, the highest award given by the American Association of Neurological Surgeons.

Books
Cytology of tumors affecting the nervous system (with David Yashon) (1969)
Scientific foundations and surgical treatment of craniosynostosis (with John A. Persing and Milton T. Edgerton) (1989)
Craniofacial surgery : science and surgical technique (2002).

References

External links
Profile at the University of Virginia

1931 births
2015 deaths
American neurosurgeons
University of Virginia School of Medicine faculty